The following are characters from the German soap opera Verbotene Liebe (Forbidden Love) who are notable for their actions or relationships, but who do not warrant their own articles.

Achim Brandner
Matthias Haase (5 August 2003 to 11 September 2003; 28 June 2005 to 23 August 2005)

Achim Brandner is the younger brother of Arno Brandner and cousin to Matthias Brandner and Philipp Brandner. He is also the father of Jana Brandner and Robin Brandner. Achim comes to Düsseldorf to visit his children. Arno is disgusted by Achim's behavior since he abandoned the kids after the death of his wife Vera. He wants to make up for the lost time and finds a supporter in his daughter Nico von Lahnstein, who wants to return into the home of her father. With Nico's support Jana also begins to have faith in her father again and the three want to leave town together, while Robin wants nothing to do with him. But when Nico discovers an old letter of her mother, saying she wasn't sure whether or not he was the father of Nico and Jana or not. With this discovery, Achim does a paternity test who proves that Jana is his daughter, while Nico isn't. Disappointed and hurt by the results Achim walks out on his children once again.
Achim returns two years later and wants Robin and Jana to think that he changed. In the end, both of his kids decide to give their father another chance and Robin even leaves with his father after his break-up with girlfriend Coco. When his daughter Jana dies in the beginning of 2008, Achim is nowhere to be seen and does not attend her funeral. But he and the also absent Robin send flowers for her grave.

Iris Brandner
Regina Nowack (2 January 1995 to 24 January 1996)

Iris Sander Brandner is the first wife of Arno Brandner and mother to Florian Brandner and Susanne Brandner. She also raised Arno's illegitimate son Jan Brandner from his previous relationship with Clarissa von Anstetten. Iris is the heart and soul of the Brandner family and is shocked when she finds out that Arno lied to her in all those years they've been married and never told her that he has another child with Clarissa. Jan's twin-sister Julia, who he falls in love with unknowingly that she is his sister. Iris has a hard time forgiving Arno for not letting her in on his secrets, which leads to marriage problems. Arno has enough from all the fighting with Iris and finds comfort in the arms of Clarissa. He begins a passionate affair with his former love. When Iris finds out about them, she decides to leave Arno for good. Iris feels betrayed by her family, when Clarissa becomes more and more present in all of their lives and escapes. Iris isn't seen for months, when a shocking news gets through the Brandner house a day after Arno's birthday. Iris died because of an ectopic pregnancy, which wasn't diagnosed in time. The Brandner's are shocked when they find out that Arno wasn't the father - Iris new lover Jürgen May was.

Philipp Brandner
Steve Hudson (May 1999 to 7 August 2000; 25 January 2005)

Philipp Brandner is the scheming cousin of Arno Brandner, Matthias Brandner and Achim Brandner. He works as an architect and soon gets a job in Arno's construction company Brandner Bau. But Philipp begins to embezzle money and costs a collapse of a fairground. Arno has to cover for Philipp's actions and gets into debt because of it. He sells his company and can't believe when Philipp appears to be the new owner; getting the company through a stooge. He buys himself and his great love Steffi Sander an expensive apartment, but is left by her when she sees him for who he really is. When Steffi then begins to date Philipp's best friend Max Jannsen, he loses it and tries to murder them. Steffi and Max survive the attempted murder and Philipp gets convicted. But he can free himself and gets away. After four and a half years, Philipp appears as a roses seller in the Bistro Schneiders. He is thrown out by one of the waiter and remains unrecognized.

Theresa Erzberger
Eva Luca Klemmt (13 May 2011 to 31 October 2011)

Theresa Erzberger is the egocentric new jockey of the Lahnstein stud farm. As soon as she starts her job, Theresa comes to close quarters with groom Dana Wolf and sees through her feelings for her brother-in-law Hagen von Lahnstein. Theresa uses sarcastic comments to describe the seemingly forbidden relationship Dana and Hagen share and soon develops a crush on the married Christian Mann. As he separates from his husband, Oliver Sabel, Christian can't deny his attraction to Theresa and the two start sleeping together. Eventually, Hagen discovers Theresa has been sabotaging the training of Dana and fires her, and Christian breaks up with her.

Silke Hansen

Silke Hansen is a fictional character on the German soap opera Verbotene Liebe (Forbidden Love). The character was played by Marnie Held from 10 October 1995 to 6 November 1995 and again on 15 August 1996, when her voice was heard on the answering machine.

Felizitas Haverdorn

Felizitas Haverdorn is a fictional character of the German soap opera Verbotene Liebe (Forbidden Love). The role has been played by author and journalist Elke Heidenreich two Episodes in July 2012, one Episode in March 2013 and other two episodes in December 2013. The part was written specifically for Heidenreich, who herself is a fan of the show, after she published a love letter to Verbotene Liebe.

Felizitas Haverdorn appears as a fun and quick-witted private eye, who is contacted by Ansgar von Lahnstein. He wants her to do a DNA match on hard drive and the lipstick of Clarissa von Anstetten. Haverdorn takes the job and quickly gets back to Ansgar. She tells him that she was successful and he can move forward with his plan against Clarissa. Ansgar is surprised by Haverdorn mentioning Clarissa's name, which he never said everything about. Felizitas tells him that she's good at her job and receives the second half of her payment.

Trutz zu Hohenfelden
Rainer Goernemann (26 July 2010 to 28 July 2010; 26 October 2010 to 27 October 2010; 19 May 2011 to 20 May 2011, 18 July 2011 to 20 September 2011)

Trutz-Alouis zu Hohenfelden is the father of Philipp and meets his son while being on a business trip in Düsseldorf. Between the two is no love left as Trutz makes it clear that he sees his son as a loser. He seems to be proven right, when Philipp asks him for 2,000,000 € to help an "old friend" out. Trutz shows his disappointment, but is willing to give Philipp the money, if he returns home with him and begins to work in the family's company. Philipp decides to go for it, when he makes a bet with his father. If Philipp loses he has to return with Trutz, but if he wins he gets the money. Philipp's wife Antonia Weber pays Trutz a visit to warn him and makes it clear that he doesn't want Philipp to win; fearing that she would lose him entirely on Nico von Lahnstein. Trutz shows up to win the bet, but eventually loses due to his big ego. Trutz gives Philipp the money and leaves Düsseldorf with the certainty to never see his son again.

Three months later, Trutz returns and wants to speak with Philipp. But father and son don't seem to find a basis to speak with each other. Nico tries to talk to Trutz and can convince Philipp to listen to what his father has to say. He finds out that Trutz is going to cancer treatment and wants his son by his side. Philipp and Trutz find a way to overcome the past and Philipp leaves Düsseldorf for a short time to help his father with the chemotherapy.
When Trutz visits Nico in May 2011, he wants to sell a family heirloom. Philipp and Nico aren't sure about Trutz' illness and Philipp even fears that his father could die soon. In the end, Nico can arrange for father and son to talk to each other and Trutz promises his son that he's fine.

Trutz returns once again, when his son has a tragic accident and is falling into a coma. He tries to be there for Nico and doesn't want her to give up hope. Trutz escorts his daughter-in-law to Munich to treat Philipp in a special clinic.

Sonja Jäger

Sonja Jäger is a fictional character on the German soap opera Verbotene Liebe (Forbidden Love). The character is played by Pia Ampaw-Fried, who debuted in the role on 6 December 2011. She left the series in a last appearance on 13 June 2012.

Sonja is introduced as an old school friend of Sebastian von Lahnstein, who is trying to find a new fashion designer for Ligne Clarisse Lahnstein, while his wife Tanja has to work on some legal issues the company is having. Sebastian tries to hire Sonja, who appears to be a talent young designer. Sonja agrees to sign on with the company, if Sebastian can win a round of table tennis against her. But Sonja knows from the beginning that she has better chances to win against her old friend. Sonja eventually signs with Ligne CL and seems to be even working good together with Tanja. But when she finds out that Sebastian and Tanja are having some problems and that she apparently run out on him, Sonja tries to make her move on Sebastian. In the meanwhile, Tanja has been kidnapped and tries to contact Sebastian. Sonja sees that Tanja is calling and ignores the call. Sebastian later gets worried about Tanja and puts the search on his wife first.

After Tanja returns and Sebastian has to leave to be with his sick daughter Christina in New Zealand, Sonja is shown to be much more reserved towards Tanja. As Clarissa von Anstetten joins the company it becomes clear that the work environment at Ligne CL is poised due to Clarissa and Tanja's hate for each other. Sonja and Tanja become rivals over Sebastian's affection which leads to Tanja wanting Sonja to leave the company. However, Sebastian convinces his wife that Sonja should stay. Tanja schemes against Sonja once more when she tries to make it look like she is secretly working for Niki DiLorenzo and is giving him her designs. Clarissa finds out the truth and so does Sebastian. It drives Sebastian and Tanja further apart. Eventually, Sebastian's marriage to Tanja seems to have come to an end and Sonja and Sebastian get closer. As they are about to have sex, Sebastian realizes that he still has feelings for Tanja and runs out on Sonja. Shortly after that, Sonja and Tanja get in an argument over Sebastian and Sonja accidentally falls down the stairs.

Tanja is accused of attempted murder and can't prove her innocence as the footage from the surveillance cameras is missing. In the meanwhile, Sonja fights for her life. After she shortly gets better, Sonja falls into a coma which she most likely won't wake up from. Valerie and Sebastian agree that Sonja needs help to have a chance at life again and is moved to a special clinic in Munich. Several weeks later, Tanja's innocence is proven and she and Sebastian reunite.

Lady Joan
Joan Collins (7 May 2010 to 11 May 2010)

Lady Joan is a British aristocratic Lady, who comes to Düsseldorf as companion of Prince Philipp zu Hohenfelden. The attractive old lady sees Philipp's interest in a young countess, Nico von Lahnstein. She begins to believe that Philipp is only with her because of Joan's money. When he wins a race, she takes his gain and leaves town with a goodbye for her former boytoy. Philipp calls her and is determined to get his money back.

Elke Käppler
Elke Bludau (23 October 2003 to 15 March 2007)

Elke Käppler is the head maid of Castle Königsbrunn, home of the aristocratic Lahnstein family. She always seems to have a little crush on Johannes von Lahnstein. While she respects his wife Cécile de Maron, who later falls in love with Johannes son Leonard, she seems to despite Elisabeth, who begins a relationship with him after Johannes' marriage to Cécile failed. Elke has a great relationship with her niece Nathalie Käppler. In 2006 it comes out that Elke once had a one-night stand with Johannes, which resulted a child. Sarah Hofmann comes to Königsbrunn to work as a maid for the Lahnstein family. It comes out that she is Elke and Johannes' illegitimate daughter. Elke later decides that she no longer can stay on the castle and leaves after Nathalie married Johannes' oldest son Ansgar. After she disappeared, Elke is hardly mentioned.

Peter Kaufmann
Ingo Klünder (1 October 1999 to 10 August 2000)

Peter Kaufmann appears to be the first husband of Clarissa von Anstetten, marrying Clarissa under her birth name Clara Prozeski. When Peter falls in love with Ingrid Bohn, he wants to leave Clarissa. But she doesn't agrees and instead blackmails Peter with his illegal business activities. But in the end, Peter isn't scared of Clarissa's threats anymore and leaves her anyway. But Clarissa wasn't playing and gives her information to the police. Peter has to flee the country and hides in South America; leaving a pregnant Ingrid behind. After the birth of her son Max, Ingrid doesn't want to live without Peter and takes her own life. Max is left to people who adopt him, while Clarissa enjoys her life, declares Peter as dead and marries the wealthy businessman Christoph von Anstetten.

Years later, Peter is brought back to Germany by the Anstetten family to out Clarissa as a fraud and bigamist. In the meanwhile, Clarissa plans to publish her autobiography. The Anstettens succeed in adding another chapter to the book and open up about Clarissa's shameful past. After Clarissa is humiliated in front of the public eye, Peter returns to South America. But soon after, he returns and falls in love with Bistro owner Charlie Schneider, Clarissa's frenemy. Charlie is suspicious of Peter because of his past with Clarissa. But after he proves his love to her, the two become a happy couple. But Clarissa has problems to see her ex-husband happy and tries to ruin his announced wedding with Charlie. Clarissa's plan works as she can seduce Peter shortly before his wedding to Charlie, who eventually breaks things with him. To let Peter suffer even more, Clarissa brings his son Max to town and sicks him on his father. Max becomes a tool to Clarissa's schemes and even begins an affair with her. But when Max learns the truth he breaks all ties with Clarissa and reunites with his father, who both leave town.

Kitty Kübler
Monica Ivancan (28 September 2006 to 4 May 2010)

Katharina "Kitty" Kübler is the beginning an assistant to one of the schemes of Tanja von Anstetten. Tanja uses Kitty to get Ansgar von Lahnstein arrested for drug possession and smuggling. When Kitty fears that her involvement could come out she leaves town for a while. But she comes back to work is a loyal secretary to Adrian Degenhardt. She helps him with his schemes and always tries to do what's best for him. But Kitty always seems to have a little problem with her intelligence, which leads to the guess that she could be a problem and not very helpful to Adrian to solve his. Adrian keeps Kitty anyway and they both share a strange friendship with each other. Kitty also becomes the frienemy of Olivia Schneider. She sleeps with Olivia's uncle Lars, after Olivia told her that he is into her. But Olivia was blackmailed to destroy with relationship between Lars and his girlfriend Nathalie and used Kitty for it. But when Olivia becomes famous as a model, Kitty is happy to call Olivia one of her friends anyway. Since then they both are seen in unity. When Olivia disappears, Kitty is only shown her role as Tanja's assistant. After 'v.L. Faces' is written out a few months after Kitty's last appearance, she is not mentioned again.

Boris Malcho

Boris Malcho is a fictional character of the German soap opera Verbotene Liebe (Forbidden Love). The character is being played by Lutz Scheffer, who debuted on 7 March 2012.

In 2012 Boris becomes the personal assistant and latest henchman of devious businesswoman Clarissa von Anstetten. He soon becomes indispensable and supports Clarissa in her role as co-managing director of Ligne Clarisse Lahnstein. Clarissa soon seems to care enough about Boris and trusts him with her secrets. Boris, next to his job as her personal assistant, also takes care of Clarissa's dirty work.

As Clarissa can prove the innocence of her business partner and archenemy Tanja von Lahnstein, she wants Boris to take care of hiding the exculpatory material. Boris later gets threaten by Tanja's husband Sebastian and his cousin Ansgar. He either gives them the footage that proves Tanja's innocence or they'll tell some Russian mobster where Boris is hiding. Even though Sebastian is just bluffing with his Russian contacts, when he calls Boris by his real name Misha, he promises Ansgar and Sebastian to get them the footage. However, Clarissa caught him and he told her the truth. Clarissa once again proves that she cares about Boris and pays off his liabilities by the mobster. Ansgar and Sebastian end up with nothing.

Rob Marenbach
Max Engelke (27 January 2010 to 6 July 2010)

Robert "Rob" Marenbach is an event manager and a great contact for Oliver Sabel to influence the party scene in Düsseldorf with the NoLimits. Oliver is impressed by Robert's ideas, which soon leads to tension with his boyfriend Christian Mann. He turns out to be a drug dealer who plans to use NoLimits as a base to sell drugs, and has displayed personal interest in Oliver, although it was unclear whether it was romantic, merely physical, or a facade to use him and his place for traffic.

After Oliver realized that his partnering with Rob was straining his relationship with Christian, parted ways with him, which made Robert resentful. He then tried to frame Oliver on drug dealing, leaving a drug package in No Limits and calling the police, but his plan backfired because Rebecca von Lahnstein hid the package and left it in his car, prompting the cops to raid his house and find drugs there. Robert was arrested.

Monseñor Mateo
Claus Wilcke (23 June 2011 to 16 January 2012)

Monseñor Mateo is introduced as superior for Padre Jan Brandner, when he arrives on Mallorca. Mateo doesn't know what to think of Jan as he switches his job more often and doesn't appear as a typical reverend. Mateo still meets Jan with respect and shows him around and hopes that he's there to stay. As time goes by, Mateo grows very found of Jan and is amazed with his work. But he also sees Jan's broken soul and puts things together as Julia Mendes is confirmed to be his twin-sister.

David McNeil
Sam Eisenstein (24 March 2003 to 9 March 2005)

David McNeil (born as Fabian Weiland) was married to Hanna Novak once. Because he was an undercover police officer and he didn't want to get Hanna in danger, he took a place in the witness protection service after he testified as principal witness. Hanna thought for years her husband was dead. When Fabian comes back as David to Düsseldorf to do business with Marie von Anstetten, he meets Hanna again. Even though she moved on and is in a relationship with the lawyer Lars Schneider, Hanna begins an affair with her former husband. Hanna's devious sister Sylvia Jones discovers the affair and blackmails her sister into ending her relationship to Lars or she would tell the press about David's role as a principal witness. Hanna ends her relationship with Lars, but he comes behind Sylvia's scheme. Furious she tells the press about David, which brings Hanna and David in danger. They can rescue themselves in the last minute. After this David and Hanna decide to stay friends. Introduced by Hanna and Lars, David meets the attractive bistro owner Charlie Schneider. They have a complicated, but also very passionate relationship with each other. When Charlie's old enemy Tanja von Anstetten returns to town, she wants to make Charlie's life miserable and uses David in one of her schemes. She seduces David and takes care that Charlie discovers them in bed together. Charlie ends the relationship, but when they both suffered because of Tanja, they decide to stay friends after all. He leaves Düsseldorf for a while, after he hasn't much success with an opera he wrote. When Charlie has money problems, she decides to fake David's death and get money for David's written opera. After this David surprisingly returns and is furious when he finds out what Charlie did. David refuses to forgive her, but in the end he sees that as a new beginning, says goodbye to Charlie and begins a new life in New York City.

Miriam Pesch
Romina Becks (30 October 2007 to 1 February 2012)

Miriam Pesch is a waitress in NoLimits. She is introduced as a classmate of Lisa Brandner, who takes interest in Constantin von Lahnstein. She later has a one-night stand with her boss, Gregor Mann and ends up kissing a drunk Christian Mann. Miriam seems to be a very nice person, who often trashes glasses in front of guests and has an unhappy love life. In 2010, she starts dating Andi Fritzsche after his relationship with Helena von Lahnstein ended because of the schemes of her brother Tristan. In late November 2010, Miriam shared a kiss with Helena and Tristian's sister Rebecca von Lahnstein and the two soon start a relationship. Unfortunately, it didn't last long, and they break up in January after deciding to be friends instead.

Alexander Rheinsberg
Frank Maier (17 November 2011 to 27 February 2012)

Alexander Rheinsberg is an old friend of Tristan von Lahnstein, who appears in Düsseldorf and shows interest in Marlene von Lahnstein.

Lukas Roloff
Christoph Dostal (7 May 2001 to 4 November 2002)

Lukas Roloff is a devious attorney, who wants was a well-known lawyer in the world of the high society. But he lost his good reputation and is determined to get it back. Lukas meets Tanja von Anstetten, who is back in Düsseldorf, and is taking an interest in her late husband's nephew, Henning von Anstetten. He wants to marry him to get the rest of the money out of the Anstetten fortune. She begins an affair with Lukas and he becomes her partner-in-crime as Tanja promises him a share of what she gets. But with all her scheming and the plan to murder Henning, Lukas becomes cold feet and tells Clarissa von Anstetten about Tanja's plan. Since Tanja wants to use Clarissa as prime suspect in Henning's murder, Clarissa is all for taking her arch enemy down once and for all. When Tanja discovers that Lukas is working with Clarissa, he attempts to kill him together with Beatrice von Beyenbach, who also has become a witness of her crime. Lukas survives but hasn't learned his lesson. He begins to flirt with Charlie Schneider to get her money. But Charlie sees through to his plan and plans on taking revenge together with her good friend Cécile de Maron. Together they are determined to get Charlie's money back. After they did, Lukas is convicted with grand theft and gets five years in prison. Lukas is never seen again in Düsseldorf.

Josefine von Rossitz
Lin Lougear (30 November 2009 to 1 December 2009; 12 March 2010 to 15 March 2010)

Josefine von Rossitz (born as von Waldensteyck) is the aunt of Luise von Waldensteyck and is contacted by her niece, when Castle Waldensteyck is about to get sold to one of Eduard von Tepp's business partner. At first, Josefine isn't very happy with Luise's choice; to marry the former call boy Gregor Mann. But as soon as she gets to know Gregor, she is smitten by him and promises Luise that she will do anything to save the Castle. Luise is shocked when she finds out that Eduard's business partner already bought the residence of the Waldensteyck family and wants to turn it into a whorehouse. Josefine later tells her niece over the phone that she couldn't have helped with the money to rescue the Castle anyway.

Sonja von Steigenberg
Anouschka Renzi (2 August 2010 to 4 August 2010; 1 February 2011 to 3 March 2011)

Sonja von Steigenberg is a former mistress of Prince Philipp zu Hohenfelden. He owes Sonja a lot of money and comes to Düsseldorf, where she meets with Philipp's wife Antonia Weber, who wants to use Sonja to keep her husband from getting closer to Nico von Lahnstein. Sonja gives Philipp time to get back her money or else she will tell Nico that her new lover is a con artist. Philipp takes part in a high-risk poker game to get Sonja's money and is happy to pay her back and keep his secret. Already believing that he will never cross paths with Sonja again, she gives Nico a call months later. Nico already knows about Philipp's shady past, but gets another surprise when Sonja delivers her a recording that can prove that Philipp in fact killed Antonia. As Sonja takes the stand in Philipp's trail, Sebastian can prove that she's lying. After that, Sonja disappears.

Butler Justus Stiehl
Claus Thull-Emden (26 November 2007 to present)

Justus Stiehl is the butler of the aristocratic Lahnstein family and very loyal. He got employed by the late Johannes von Lahnstein, only months before his tragic presumed death. Justus is very serious about his work and tries to keep everything together. For a long time he seems to head the personnel of the castle until the arrival of Stella Mann, who becomes the caretaker and head of the staff. Justus seems to be a cold and snobby character, but has a warm soul.

Eduard von Tepp
Hubertus Regout (9 February 2009 to 15 March 2010)

Eduard von Tepp is a wealthy baron and the fiancé of Luise von Waldensteyck. He is a very snobby personality and likes things to be planned out in every single detail. He is a passionate fan of antic cigar boxes. A love he doesn't share with his fiancée. His love to Luise seems to be more like a business for him. The principality of Waldensteyck has serious money problems and with his marriage to Luise he would help them out. When Luise falls in love with Gregor Mann and wants to break her engagement with Eduard, he tells her that he may be the only chance to rescue Waldensteyck. Luise is shocked that Eduard knew all along that their marriage wasn't about two people loving each other. Eduard tries everything to bring Gregor and Luise away from each other. He wants to destroy Gregor and manipulate his helicopter, so he crashed with Luise and Gregor. They survived the crash, so Eduard tries to kill Gregor in the hospital. When Luise finds out, she is in shock and realizes what Eduard is capable of. Gregor and Luise press charges against him, but Eduard is nowhere to be found. They later get word that Eduard is somewhere in Italy, hiding from German authorities. But he shows up again on Luise and Gregor's wedding day. He holds Luise hostage and wants a final duel with Gregor. A duel of life and death. Gregor wins, when his brother Christian shows up and they both take Eduard to wait for the police to take him away. After they overcome this crisis, Luise and Gregor get married.

Rafael Velasquez
Marc Philipp (18 July 2011 to 5 December 2011)

Rafael Velasquez is introduced as a friend of Timo Mendes. Rafael is openly gay and soon starts to flirt with Oliver Sabel, who he meets on the beach. Olli takes a vacation from his broken marriage with Christian Mann and seems to find the perfect distraction in the charming Rafael. The two go together to Timo's house party, where Rafael kisses Olli. The married man is insecure about how far he wants this flirt to go and stops Rafael, only to give in a little later. Rafael and Olli spend a passionate night together. Olli wakes up alone, while Rafael is asking Timo where Olli went.
Weeks later, Rafael is seen in the 'No Limits' in Düsseldorf, searching for Olli. This comes to a time when Olli and Christian get closer again. As Rafael is about to continue his affair with Olli, Christian tries to win his husband back. Christian makes one last attempt, when Olli and Rafael decide to vacate in Ibiza, but fails as he close misses Olli.
Rafael's love for Olli soon is doomed when Olli realizes that he is still in love with Christian and bluntly tells Rafael that he doesn't love him and that all they had between them was an affair and nothing more. When Oliver goes to the hospital to reunite with Christian, who had suffered cardiac arrest because of his heart, Rafael packs up his bags and leaves.

Wilhelm von Waldensteyck
Michael Tietz (28 April 2009 to 30 July 2009; 6 November 2009)

Wilhelm von Waldensteyck is the seriously ill father of Luise von Waldensteyck. His daughter takes over the business for him to representative the family and living a life of a socialite. The principality of Waldensteyck has serious money problems, which leads to Luise marrying the wealthy Eduard von Tepp. But Luise has fallen in love with Gregor Mann. When she wants to break the engagement to Eduard, Wilhelm tells his daughter to put the happiness of an entire principality in front of her own. Luise tries her best, but his disappoint when she finds out that her marriage with Eduard was more about business than anything else. The begging of her father to don't let Waldensteyck go down makes the decision between heart and mind for Luise not any easier. On 30 July 2009 Wilhelm died getting the promise from Luise that she will marry Eduard in order to save Waldensteyck. But Luise later decides to marry Gregor anyway. On her wedding day, the ghost of Wilhelm appears to his daughter and gives her his blessing.

Antonia Weber
Ricarda Bramley (25 May 2010 to 10 December 2010)

Antonia Weber is the scheming wife of Philipp zu Hohenfelden. She appears in Düsseldorf after Philipp made contact to the wealthy Nico von Lahnstein. Her plan is it that Philipp appears to fall for Nico to get to her money, like they did with other women before. But Antonia doesn't realize that Philipp begins to really fall for Nico. Meanwhile, Antonia plans to have Philipp kidnapped to get the ransom from her. Philipp stops his plan against Nico, which leads for Antonia to scheme against the couple. She even kidnaps Nico herself and tries to do everything to blackmail Philipp into coming back to her. After Nico and Philipp thought that Antonia got arrested, she comes back to Düsseldorf and wants to meet with Philipp. When he arrives at her hotel room, he finds Antonia dead after she committed suicide. Antonia left a personal diary which indicates that Philipp played her and Nico for months and that he in fact killed Antonia, while she was still in love with him and hoping for a happy end. Philipp decides to hide the diary from Nico and also from the police. As Nico discovers it by accident she's furious with Philipp but decides to stay with him when he wants to turn it to the police. He later returns and tells Nico that the charges against him were dropped. When Nico finds out that he never showed the police Antonia's diary she questions their relationship and Philipp's love for her again. Eventually Nico comes around as Philipp has already given the diary to the police. With the evidence against him, Philipp is sure that Antonia has done anything to let him pay for her death.

Walter Wittkamp
Josef Quadflieg (21 June 1995)
Erich Krieg (27 July 2011 to 10 August 2011)

Walter Wittkamp is the abusive father of Tanja von Anstetten and her younger siblings Meike and Thomas. He's married to their mother Annegret. Walter first appears in June 1995, when he has to sell his stud farm to Christoph von Anstetten. Tanja is angry with her father that he doesn't see another way to hold on to their property and takes the promise of young Jan Brandner that she always can visit her horse at Castle Friedenau. This is the perfect invitation for Tanja into a world of wealth and power. Tanja burns all bridges with her hated family.

When Tanja's mother Annegret reappears in 2008, she tells her daughter that Walter died. Annegret wants to reconcile with Tanja, when a family secret comes out. Tanja spent years in psychiatric care, after she was held responsible for Thomas' tragic death. Annegret admits that it was Walter who took the life of Thomas by pushing him down the stairs. Tanja makes it perfectly clear that her parents were never there for her and wants Annegret to leave. After one last attempt to reunite with Tanja, Annegret decides to commit suicide.

In 2011, Tanja is hunted by her father's ghost, after she gets locked in an ice cellar from Rebecca von Lahnstein. The hallucinations tell Tanja that she's worthless and will always be alone. Walter tells his daughter that she will have no other than him and that he will never leave her alone. Tanja is scared out of her mind and breaks down in tears when Sebastian finds her. After resting under Sebastian's watch, Tanja is all alone again when she wakes up and hunted by Walter once again. Tanja wants to make sure to get rid of her father and starts to mix up reality with her hallucinations. She buys a gun in order to murder Walter, but instead shoots Sebastian who in her mind she sees as Walter. Tanja is shocked about her doing and is glad when Sebastian wants to hear her story. Tanja tells Sebastian about the abuse, the death of Thomas and her two years in a psychiatric institution. In the end Sebastian promises her that she never has to fear anything ever again.

See also
List of Verbotene Liebe characters

Notes

 
Verbotene Liebe
Verbotene Liebe